Minh Le (Vietnamese: Lê Minh), also known by his online nickname Gooseman, is a Vietnamese Canadian video game programmer who co-created the Half-Life mod Counter-Strike with Jess Cliffe in 1999 and started the Counter-Strike series. He was later employed by Valve, the developers of Half-Life, and worked for 8 years in Korea on the multiplayer first-person shooter Tactical Intervention. He is a contractor on the multiplayer survival first-person shooter Rust. In the small-team games that he has worked on, Le has been a programmer, modeler, and designer.

His nickname comes from Shane Gooseman, one of the main characters of 1980s cartoon series The Adventures of the Galaxy Rangers.

Biography
Minh Le was born in Vietnam. In 1979, he and his parents left Vietnam on a boat and immigrated to Canada as refugees.

Le attended Simon Fraser University from 1996 to 2001, graduating in 2001 with a Bachelor of Applied Science degree in Computing Science. His curriculum and electives were "focused mainly on computer graphics courses covering subjects such as compression algorithms, 3D animation techniques, image recognition."

Le picked up id Software's Quake in 1996 and began playing with its software development kit, and after about a year he completed his first mod, Navy SEALs, Counter-Strikes spiritual predecessor. While he was working on the Action Quake 2 mod, he came up with the idea for Counter-Strike and became friends with Action Quake 2s webmaster Jess Cliffe and Marcelo Dilay.

Le began work on Counter-Strike as a mod for Half-Life while he was in the middle of his fourth year at Simon Fraser University (he later graduated with a degree in computer science). He spent about 20 hours a week on making the mod, expending more effort on it than he did on his schoolwork, and released the first beta version in June 1999. The "Counter-Strike Team" quickly produced several more beta releases in the following months as the game's popularity skyrocketed.

By the fourth beta version, Valve, the developer who created Half-Life, began assisting in the development of Counter-Strike. In 2000, Valve bought the rights to Counter-Strike and hired Le and Cliffe to work with them in Bellevue, Washington, where Le continued to work on Counter-Strike and related games. During this time he was developing Counter-Strike 2, however Valve eventually put this project on hold indefinitely.

After Counter-Strike 2 was shelved, Le left Valve in 2006 to work on a project of his own. After two years working with a small team on this project, he moved to South Korea in 2008 to work with a business named FIX Korea who provided funding for further development. Le's new game was later revealed to be Tactical Intervention, a game similar in style to Counter-Strike created with a modified version of Valve's Source engine.

In October 2013, he joined Facepunch Studios, where he worked on Rust. He left Facepunch Studios in February 2018.

In March 2018, he joined Pearl Abyss to start working on a new project for the game studio that made the MMORPG Black Desert Online.

Recognition

In 2003, a GameSpy editorial cited Minh Le as the most important reason Half-Life was still popular five years after it was released. IGN ranked Jess Cliffe and Minh Le as number 14 in their "Top 100 Game Creators of All Time" list.

References

External links 
 

Canadian computer programmers
Canadian people of Vietnamese descent
Canadian software engineers
Canadian video game designers
Vietnamese engineers
Living people
Simon Fraser University alumni
Valve Corporation people
Video game programmers
Year of birth missing (living people)